The Convict Tramway was hauled by human power: convicts from the Port Arthur convict settlement. and was created to replace the hazardous sea voyage from Hobart to Port Arthur, Tasmania. Charles O'Hara Booth oversaw the construction of the tramway.

It opened in 1836 and ran for 8 km (5 miles) from Oakwood to Taranna. By most definitions, the tramway was the first passenger-carrying railway/tramway in Australia. An unconfirmed report says that it continued to Eaglehawk Neck and, if this was so, the length of the tramway would have been more than doubled. The gauge is unknown. The tramway carried passengers and freight (with a capacity of one half-ton), and ran on wooden rails. The track was not levelled but followed the natural elevation of the ground; on descending a hill the runners were permitted to ride on the vehicle. One team of convicts—usually three in number—could complete up to three round trips per day, carrying freight in both directions. If proving themselves trustworthy the men were eventually rewarded with permission to access less restricted part of the colony. A sketch by Col. Mundy, which is held in the Tasmanian Archives, shows four convicts providing the motive power. The date of closure is unknown, but it was certainly prior to 1877.

References

History of transport in Tasmania